Antonio "Tatang" Ilustrisimo (1904 in Bagong, Bantayan, Cebu – 1997) was the Grandmaster of Kalis Ilustrisimo (KI), a Filipino martial art bearing his family name.

Early life 
As a boy, Ilustrisimo studied eskrima from his father. At the age of nine, he decided to travel to the United States. He stowed away on a boat he thought was headed for America. Instead, he arrived in Mindanao in the southern Philippine islands.

The martial arts 
Ilustrisimo was one of the most well-respected eskrimadors in the Philippines. He was famed for winning countless duels and street encounters, as well as taking up arms as a guerrilla fighter against the invading Japanese forces during World War II. Ilustrisimo was never defeated in combat, and earned great respect as a result of his brave exploits against the Japanese.

In 1976, at the age of 72, Ilustrisimo accepted his first students, Antonio Diego and Epifanio 'Yuli' Romo. He had previously refused to accept students because of his work. After his death in 1997, Tony Diego was elected head of KI. Other notable students include Rey Galang, Christopher Ricketts, Romeo Macapagal, Henry Espera and Norman Suanico.

Death 
Unfortunately, Ilustrisimo died a poor man. He was never recognized for his efforts in World War II.

Publications 
His life and art were featured in the book titled Filipino Martial Culture by Mark Wiley. The same author included a section on Kalis Ilustrisimo in Filipino Fighting Arts: Theory and Practice. Two of his most prominent students, Antonio Diego and Christopher Ricketts, published The Secrets of Kalis Ilustrisimo in the United States, with a foreword by Wiley.

References 

 Mark V. Wiley (1997). Filipino Martial Culture,  Tuttle Publishing.
 Mark V. Wiley (2000). Filipino Fighting Arts: Theory and Practice,  Tuttle Publishing.
 A.Diego/C.Ricketts (2002) The Secrets of Kalis Ilustrisimo,  Tuttle Publishing.
 Reynaldo S. Galang (2005) " Warrior Arts of the Philippines",  Arjee Enterprises

See also
Arnis
Filipino Martial Arts
Lameco Eskrima

Filipino eskrimadors
Filipino people of World War II
People from Cebu
1904 births
1997 deaths